Murallas blancas, is a Mexican telenovela that aired on  Canal 4, Telesistema Mexicano in 1960. Production of Ernesto Alonso. The telenovela was talking about a woman who did everything possible to save their patients from a hospital where she was the nurse.

Plot 
This telenovela is set in a hospital where a series of clinical cases is. A young nurse serves as a thread while in consecrates his life helping others.

Cast 
 María Tereza Montoya
 Miguel Manzano
 Tony Carbajal
 Carmen Molina
 Consuelo Guerrero de Luna
 Dina de Marco

References 

1960 telenovelas
Mexican telenovelas
Televisa telenovelas
Television shows set in Mexico City
1960 Mexican television series debuts
1960 Mexican television series endings
Spanish-language telenovelas